Treetop or Treetops may refer to:

The top of a tree
Tree Top, an American fruit processing company
Treetops Hotel, Aberdare National Park, Kenya
Treetops (state park), former estate of torch singer and actress Libby Holman, now the Mianus River State Park, Connecticut, USA
Treetops School, a special school in Grays, Essex, England
Treetops, East Virginia, fictional setting of Shoe (comic strip)
"Treetop", nickname of Jack Straus (1930-1988), American poker player and winner of the 1982 World Series of Poker Main Event
"Treetop", nickname of Delbert Fowler (born 1958), American football player in the Canadian Football League

Lists of people by nickname